Silene regia is a species of flowering plant in the family Caryophyllaceae known by the common name royal catchfly. It is native to the central United States. A  perennial herb, it grows from a fleshy taproot and has several erect stems growing up to 1.6 meters tall. The leaves are lance-shaped to oval and up to 12 centimeters long, becoming smaller farther up the stem. The inflorescence is an array of many flowers at the top of the stem. The elongate tubular calyx of sepals is up to 2.5 centimeters long and has 10 longitudinal veins. The lobes of the bright red corolla are 1 to 2 centimeters long. 

The flowers are pollinated by the ruby-throated hummingbird. This plant is similar to the other two red-flowered eastern North American Silene, S. virginica and S. rotundifolia.

This plant is native to the tallgrass prairie of the American Midwest. It occurs in grassland and woodland. It has been found on roadsides and outcrops, and in pastures. It is found in open, sunny spots. It has been found in the states of Kansas, Oklahoma, Arkansas, Missouri, Illinois, Indiana, Ohio, Kentucky, Tennessee, Georgia, Alabama, and Florida. It has been extirpated from Kansas and Tennessee and it is rare throughout most of the rest of its range. It may be most prevalent in Missouri.

The main threat to the species is the loss of habitat to agricultural use. Its native prairie habitat has been reduced so that now the plant mainly grows on roadsides and rights-of-way. It is also threatened by fire suppression, which eliminates the normal fire regime that keeps the habitat open and sunny. Larger and woody vegetation moves into the habitat when fire is reduced, and the Silene cannot compete.

References

regia
Flora of North America